A cat hole may refer to:

a hawsehole, a hole on the hull of a ship, designed for passing hawsers through; or
a cathole, a hole dug to dispose of human feces, usually used by hikers.